Angel Parker is an American actress. Since 2000 she has appeared in numerous films, TV series and has done voice acting on video games. Her most notable credits include Criminal Minds (2008), ER (2008-2009), Marvel’s Runaways (2017-2019), and The Rookie (2019-2022).

Biography and career
Angel Parker was accepted into the American Academy of Dramatic Arts at age 16, and since 2000 she has been acting. Some of her most notable roles include Tasha Davenport on Disney XD's Lab Rats, Shawn Chapman in the Emmy Award-winning FX series American Crime Story: The People vs. OJ Simpson, Catherine Wilder, Marvel's action series, Runaways.

In year 2000, she starred in Joss Whedon's Angel.  Additional credits include The Good Doctor, NCIS: Los Angeles,  9-1-1: Lone Star, The Rookie, REL, The Strain, Trial & Error, Castle, Criminal Minds, ER, Kevin Costner's ABC pilot National Parks, NBC's pilot La Brea and Grand Crew.

In 2002, she appeared on Animal Kingdom, Hulu's The Dropout, the independent feature film Prisoner's Daughter and Netflix's The Recruit in a reoccurring role.

Personal life

Angel currently lives in Los Angeles with her husband, actor Eric Nenninger, and their two children James (born 2004) and Naomi (born 2012).

Filmography

Film/Movie

Television

Video Games

References

External links

Angel Parker interview on Marvel's Runaways and history acting, ComicsVerse

Living people
21st-century American actresses
American film actresses
American television actresses
American video game actresses
Year of birth missing (living people)
Place of birth missing (living people)
American Academy of Dramatic Arts alumni